Herluf Zahle (14 March 1873 – 4 May 1941) was a Danish barrister with the Supreme Court, a career diplomat and the President of the League of Nations from 1928 to 1929.

References 
Herluf Zahle at Dansk Biografisk Haandleksikon

External links
 

1873 births
1941 deaths
Danish barristers and advocates
Danish diplomats